"Just A-Sittin' and A-Rockin'" is a 1941 song written by Billy Strayhorn and Lee Gaines.

Notable recordings
Johnny Dankworth - The Best of Johnny Dankworth (2008)
June Christy - Recalls Those Kenton Days (1959), The Best Of The Capitol Years
Ella Fitzgerald - Ella Fitzgerald Sings the Duke Ellington Songbook (1958)
Stan Kenton - On AFRS: 1944-45 (2006) vocal by June Christy
Chris Barber's Jazz and Blues Band with Ray Nance on trumpet at the Funkhaus Hannover 28 September 1974
Mel Torme -  on the album I Dig the Duke! I Dig the Count! (1961)
Rosemary Clooney - for her album Blue Rose (1956)
The Delta Rhythm Boys - ''release charted #17, "their first (and only) chart success" (December 1945)

See also
 Duke Ellington
 Duke Ellington discography

References

Songs with music by Duke Ellington
Songs with lyrics by Lee Gaines
1940s jazz standards
1941 songs
Songs with music by Billy Strayhorn